Lower Fish Pond is located southeast of Oregon, New York. Fish species present in the lake are pickerel, white sucker, sunfish, and brown bullhead. There is a trail along the eastern shore.

References

Lakes of New York (state)
Lakes of Warren County, New York